Aégis is the third studio album by Norwegian gothic metal band Theatre of Tragedy, and the last album of their musical period defined by gothic stylings and Early Modern English lyrics.

Music and lyrics 
As with Theatre of Tragedy's previous albums, the lyrics are written in Early Modern English (except "Venus", in Latin) which sounds very different from modern English: Vaunt! - Devil tyne - Wadst thou wane fore'ermae? (from the song "Angélique"). The subject matter is drawn from a range of European folklore and history: Venus and Poppæa are from Roman sources; Aœde, Cassandra, Bacchante and Siren are drawn from Greek mythology; while Lorelei refers to a Nix from German stories, and Angélique is inspired by medieval poem Orlando Furioso.

Track listing

Personnel

Theatre of Tragedy
Raymond Rohonyi - vocals
Liv Kristine Espenæs - vocals
Frank Claussen - guitars
Tommy Olsson - guitars
Lorentz Aspen - synthesizer
Eirik T. Saltrø - bass
Hein Frode Hansen - drums

Singles
From this period there were 2 releases.
"Cassandra" was the only single taken from the album and was released in April 1998. It was released in shorter version called "Cheap Wine Edit" and backed with "Aœde (Edit)"

Charts

External links

References

1998 albums
Theatre of Tragedy albums
Massacre Records albums